The Quine–McCluskey algorithm (QMC), also known as the method of prime implicants, is a method used for minimization of Boolean functions that was developed by Willard V. Quine in 1952 and extended by Edward J. McCluskey in 1956. As a general principle this approach had already been demonstrated by the logician Hugh McColl in 1878, was proved by Archie Blake in 1937, and was rediscovered by Edward W. Samson and Burton E. Mills in 1954 and by Raymond J. Nelson in 1955. Also in 1955, Paul W. Abrahams and John G. Nordahl as well as Albert A. Mullin and Wayne G. Kellner proposed a decimal variant of the method.

The Quine–McCluskey algorithm is functionally identical to Karnaugh mapping, but the tabular form makes it more efficient for use in computer algorithms, and it also gives a deterministic way to check that the minimal form of a Boolean function has been reached. It is sometimes referred to as the tabulation method.

The method involves two steps:
 Finding all prime implicants of the function.
 Use those prime implicants in a prime implicant chart to find the essential prime implicants of the function, as well as other prime implicants that are necessary to cover the function.

Complexity
Although more practical than Karnaugh mapping when dealing with more than four variables, the Quine–McCluskey algorithm also has a limited range of use since the problem it solves is NP-complete. The running time of the Quine–McCluskey algorithm grows exponentially with the number of variables. Functions with a large number of variables have to be minimized with potentially non-optimal heuristic methods, of which the Espresso heuristic logic minimizer was the de facto standard in 1995.

Step two of the algorithm amounts to solving the set cover problem; NP-hard instances of this problem may occur in this algorithm step.

Example

Input
We encode all of this information by writing

The summation symbol  denotes the logical sum (logical OR, or disjunction) of all the terms being summed over.

Step 1: finding prime implicants
First, we write the function as a table (where 'x' stands for don't care):
{| class="wikitable"
|-
!   !! A !! B !! C !! D !! f
|-
| m0 || 0 || 0 || 0 || 0 || 0
|-
| m1 || 0 || 0 || 0 || 1 || 0
|-
| m2 || 0 || 0 || 1 || 0 || 0
|-
| m3 || 0 || 0 || 1 || 1 || 0
|-
| m4 || 0 || 1 || 0 || 0 || 1
|-
| m5 || 0 || 1 || 0 || 1 || 0
|-
| m6 || 0 || 1 || 1 || 0 || 0
|-
| m7 || 0 || 1 || 1 || 1 || 0
|-
| m8 || 1 || 0 || 0 || 0 || 1
|-
| m9 || 1 || 0 || 0 || 1 || x
|-
| m10 || 1 || 0 || 1 || 0 || 1
|-
| m11 || 1 || 0 || 1 || 1 || 1
|-
| m12 || 1 || 1 || 0 || 0 || 1
|-
| m13 || 1 || 1 || 0 || 1 || 0
|-
| m14 || 1 || 1 || 1 || 0 || x
|-
| m15 || 1 || 1 || 1 || 1 || 1
|}

One can easily form the canonical sum of products expression from this table, simply by summing the minterms (leaving out don't-care terms) where the function evaluates to one:

f = A'BC'D' + AB'C'D' + AB'CD' + AB'CD + ABC'D' + ABCD.

which is not minimal. So to optimize, all minterms that evaluate to one are first placed in a minterm table. Don't-care terms are also added into this table (names in parentheses), so they can be combined with minterms:

{| class="wikitable"
|-
! Numberof 1s !! Minterm !! BinaryRepresentation
|-
| rowspan="2" | 1
| m4 || 
|-
| m8 || 
|-
| rowspan="3" | 2
| (m9) || 
|-
| m10 || 
|-
| m12 || 
|-
| rowspan="2" | 3
| m11 || 
|-
| (m14) || 
|-
|| 4
| m15 || 
|}

At this point, one can start combining minterms with other minterms. If two terms differ by only a single digit, that digit can be replaced with a dash indicating that the digit doesn't matter. Terms that can't be combined any more are marked with an asterisk. For instance 1000 and 1001 can be combined to give 100-, indicating that both minterms imply the first digit is 1 and the next two are 0.

{| class="wikitable"
|-
! Numberof 1s !! Minterm !! 0-Cube !! colspan="2" | Size 2 Implicants 
|-
| rowspan="4" | 1
| m4 ||  || m(4,12) || 
|-
| m8 ||  || m(8,9) || 
|-
| colspan="2"  || m(8,10) || 
|-
| colspan="2"  || m(8,12) || 
|-
| rowspan="4" | 2
| m9 ||  || m(9,11) || 
|-
| m10 ||  || m(10,11) || 
|-
| colspan="2"  || m(10,14) || 
|-
| m12 ||  || m(12,14) || 
|-
| rowspan="2" | 3
| m11 ||  || m(11,15) || 
|-
| m14 ||  || m(14,15) || 
|-
| rowspan="1" | 4
| m15 ||  || colspan="2" 
|}

When going from Size 2 to Size 4, treat - as a third bit value. Match up the -'s first.  The terms represent products and to combine two product terms they must have the same variables. One of the variables should be complemented in one term and uncomplemented in the other. The remaining variables present should agree. So to match two terms the -'s must align and all but one of the other digits must be the same. For instance, -110 and -100 can be combined to give -1-0, as can -110 and -010 to give --10, but -110 and 011- cannot since the -'s do not align. -110 corresponds to BCD' while 
011- corresponds to A'BC, and BCD' + A'BC is not equivalent to a product term.
{| class="wikitable"
|-
! Numberof 1s !! Minterm !! 0-Cube !! colspan="2" | Size 2 Implicants !! colspan="2" | Size 4 Implicants
|-
| rowspan="4" | 1
| m4 ||  || m(4,12) ||  ||colspan="2" 
|-
| m8 ||  || m(8,9) ||  || m(8,9,10,11) || 
|-
| colspan="2"  || m(8,10) ||  || m(8,10,12,14)  || 
|-
| colspan="2"  || m(8,12) ||  ||colspan="2" 
|-
| rowspan="4" | 2
| m9 ||  || m(9,11) ||  ||colspan="2" 
|-
| m10 ||  || m(10,11) ||  || m(10,11,14,15) || 
|-
| colspan="2"  || m(10,14) ||  ||colspan="2" 
|-
| m12 ||  || m(12,14) ||  ||colspan="2" 
|-
| rowspan="2" | 3
| m11 ||  || m(11,15) ||  ||colspan="2" 
|-
| m14 ||  || m(14,15) ||  ||colspan="2" 
|-
| rowspan="1" | 4
| m15 ||  || colspan="2" 
| colspan="2" 
|}

Note: In this example, none of the terms in the size 4 implicants table can be combined any further. In general this process should be continued (sizes 8, 16 etc.) until no more terms can be combined.

Step 2: prime implicant chart
None of the terms can be combined any further than this, so at this point we construct an essential prime implicant table. Along the side goes the prime implicants that have just been generated (these are the ones that have been marked with a "" in the previous step), and along the top go the minterms specified earlier. The don't care terms are not placed on top—they are omitted from this section because they are not necessary inputs.

{| class="wikitable" style="text-align:center;"
|-
!                             || 4 || 8 || 10 || 11 || 12 || 15 || ⇒ || A || B || C || D
|-
| style="text-align:left;" | m(4,12)        ||  || || || ||  ||   || ⇒ ||  || 1 || 0 || 0
|-
| style="text-align:left;" | m(8,9,10,11)    || ||  ||  ||  || || || ⇒ || 1 || 0 ||  || 
|-
| style="text-align:left;" | m(8,10,12,14)   || ||  ||  || ||  || || ⇒ || 1 ||  ||  || 0
|-
| style="text-align:left;" | m(10,11,14,15) || || ||  ||  || ||  || ⇒ || 1 ||  || 1 || 
|}

To find the essential prime implicants, we look for columns with only one "✓". If a column has only one "✓", this means that the minterm can only be covered by one prime implicant. This prime implicant is essential.

For example: in the first column, with minterm 4, there is only one "✓". This means that m(4,12) is essential. Minterm 15 also has only one "✓", so m(10,11,14,15) is also essential. Now all columns with one "✓" are covered.

The second prime implicant can be 'covered' by the third and fourth, and the third prime implicant can be 'covered' by the second and first, and neither is thus essential. If a prime implicant is essential then, as would be expected, it is necessary to include it in the minimized boolean equation. In some cases, the essential prime implicants do not cover all minterms, in which case additional procedures for chart reduction can be employed. The simplest "additional procedure" is trial and error, but a more systematic way is Petrick's method. In the current example, the essential prime implicants do not handle all of the minterms, so, in this case, the essential implicants can be combined with one of the two non-essential ones to yield one equation:

f = BC'D' + AB' + AC
or
f = BC'D' + AD' + AC

Both of those final equations are functionally equivalent to the original, verbose equation:
f = A'BC'D' + AB'C'D' + AB'C'D + AB'CD' + AB'CD + ABC'D' + ABCD' + ABCD.

See also
 Blake canonical form
 Buchberger's algorithm – analogous algorithm for algebraic geometry
 Petrick's method
 Qualitative comparative analysis (QCA)

References

Further reading
  (viii+635 pages) (NB. This book was reprinted by Chin Jih in 1969.)
  (47 pages)
  (4 pages)
 
   (7 pages)
   (22 pages)
  (16 pages) (NB. QCA, an open source, R based implementation used in the social sciences.)

External links
 Quine-McCluskey algorithm implementation with a search of all solutions, by Frédéric Carpon.
 Karċma 3, A set of logic synthesis tools including Karnaugh maps, Quine-McCluskey minimization, BDDs, probabilities, teaching module and more. Logic Circuits Synthesis Labs (LogiCS) - UFRGS, Brazil.
 BFunc, QMC based Boolean logic simplifiers supporting up to 64 inputs / 64 outputs (independently) or 32 outputs (simultaneously), by António Costa 
 Python Implementation by Robert Dick, with an optimized version.
 Python Implementation for symbolically reducing Boolean expressions.
 Quinessence, an open source implementation written in Free Pascal by Marco Caminati.
 minBool an implementation by Andrey Popov.
 QMC applet, an applet for a step by step analyze of the QMC- algorithm by Christian Roth
 C++ implementation SourceForge.net C++ program implementing the algorithm.
 Perl Module by Darren M. Kulp.
 Tutorial Tutorial on Quine-McCluskey and Petrick's method.
 Petrick C++ implementation (including Petrick) based on the tutorial above.
 C program Public Domain console based C program on SourceForge.net.

 For a fully worked out example visit: http://www.cs.ualberta.ca/~amaral/courses/329/webslides/Topic5-QuineMcCluskey/sld024.htm
 The Boolean Bot: A JavaScript implementation for the web: http://booleanbot.com/
 open source gui QMC minimizer
 Computer Simulation Codes for the Quine-McCluskey Method, by Sourangsu Banerji.

Boolean algebra
Willard Van Orman Quine